Kaali Venkat (born 5 May 1984) is an Indian actor who mainly appears in Tamil language films.

Personal life
Venkat hails from Kudaiyadevanpatti a village near Kovilpatti. Venkat used to act in dramas during his school days. With an ambition to act in films he moved from his village to Chennai in 1997 to enter the Tamil film industry. In Chennai, he was doing jobs like selling groceries in order to survive until he met director Vijay Prabakaran. Prabakaran, who Venkat considers his guru, coached and taught him "everything I know about cinema today".

Venkat got married on 30 October 2017 in Chennai.

Career
The first film Venkat acted was also by Vijay Prabhakaran, Thasaiyinai Thee Sudinum. The film failed to release but Venkat decided to keep his character name in it, Kaali, as his screen name after everybody on the set was calling him by that name. He then acted in various short films made for the Kalaignar TV show Naalaya Iyakkunar and won the Best Actor in a Series Award in Season 3 of the show. After a series of small roles in various feature films, he first gained attention with his role in the action drama Thadaiyara Thaakka. The short films fetched him small roles in bigger projects like Kalakalappu and Udhayam NH4. He played a substantial role in mystery thriller Thegidi, which went on to become a sleeper hit and Venkat stated that he was flooded with friend requests on Facebook post the film's release.

Venkat has acted in a number of films, including Mundaasupatti, Kaathadi, Urumeen, India Pakistan and Eetti. Mundaasupatti, based on the same-titled short film which Venkat was also part of, will see him playing the role of an assistant photographer called Azhagasami. In 2016, Kaali portrayed a drunkard father in Irudhi Suttru and a loyal friend of a politician in Kodi. In 2020, he acted in Suriya's Soorarai Potru.

Filmography

Films

Web series

References

External links
 

Male actors in Tamil cinema
Living people
Tamil comedians
People from Thoothukudi district
Indian male film actors
1984 births